The Pentax K-5 II is a 16.3-megapixel digital single-lens reflex camera, successor to the Pentax K-5, sharing its body shape with its two predecessors including the Pentax K-7, and making incremental improvements on the K-5. 

Both models have improved autofocus ability, particularly in low and tungsten light, down to −3EV, which at the time of release makes it the best low-light autofocus camera. Also improved is the sensitivity of the central AF area which now has an AF base of f/2.8 instead of the common f/5.6. This increased AF base length helps to improve focus accuracy, in particular with fast (wide aperture) lenses and in low light.

The Pentax K-5 II/IIs each have HD video capabilities, with resolutions of 1920×1080 (at 25 fps), 1280×720 (at 25 & 30 fps), 640×480 (at 25 & 30 fps).

Externally, the cameras are distinguished by a recessed screen, where the K-5 had a flush-mounted one. The K-5II/IIs has a gapless design—the typical air gap is avoided by the use of a special resin—helps to reduce internal reflections and gives better visibility in bright light. The material of the screen has been changed from plastic to tempered glass, which is scratch resistant. Like its predecessor, the K-5 II/IIs is fully weather-sealed.

It has the highest camera sensor rating of any Pentax APS-C camera, according to DxO Labs, with a score of 82.

Pentax K-5 IIs
The Pentax K-5 IIs is a version of the K-5 II which omits the traditional low pass filter for greater sharpness but potentially greater moiré.

Bundling
The K-5 II/IIs are available in two different kits, one including the DA 18–55 mm WR lens, and the other the DA 18–135 mm WR lens, as well as a body only.

References 

Cameras introduced in 2012
Live-preview digital cameras
K-5 II
Pentax K-mount cameras